Waldorf System, Incorporated was the first lunchroom chain in New England, founded by Henry S. Kelsey in Springfield, Massachusetts in 1903. It was named after the Waldorf Hotel in New York City. Its trademark was the Red Apple.

It expanded rapidly. In its first 12 years, it had 23 locations in Boston and Cambridge and 37 more elsewhere in New England. At its peak, it had around 200 locations in seven states. Its headquarters moved to 169 High Street, Boston. The stores were often called "Waldorf Lunch".

Waldorf prepared most foods in central kitchens which distributed individually wrapped portions to its restaurants for reheating and browning. In 1918, its main commissary occupied the whole of 69 Purchase Street, Boston, a total of 65,000 square feet of floor space, and had 100 employees, working 24 hours a day. Later, each of its geographical divisions had a commissary. Restaurants also did short order cooking for items such as hamburgers and ham and eggs. 

Menus were distributed weekly from headquarters. Waldorf ran a central purchasing operation with strict specifications and bought in quantity. For example, it once purchased 14 carloads of turkeys. Headquarters also specified detailed portion sizes.

Service was from individual stands run by a "lunch man" and displaying all the menu items except the hot ones, which were ordered from the kitchen. Unlike most cafeterias, there was no tray rail.

The Harvard Square location opened in 1913 and closed in 1938, when it became a Hayes-Bickford cafeteria. In 2017, when the space was being renovated to become a branch of the local Clover Food Lab chain, the original Waldorf decor, with college pennants in tile, was exposed.

Besides operating retail restaurants, the Waldorf System built and operated company lunchrooms.

In 1919, the Waldorf company went public. By then, it had 38 stores and had acquired Kinney & Woodward (14 stores) and Baldwin's (7), also founded in Springfield from 1904-1909. In 1919, Waldorf acquired the assets of the Automat Company, a local automat restaurant, and in 1924 converted the Little Building location to cafeteria format. It also acquired the Clark Restaurant Company (1922, restaurants in Ohio), the Ginter Restaurant Company (1927, Boston table service restaurants), St. Clairs', Inc. (1929, Massachusetts table service restaurants), and the Fort Hill Supply Company (1927, restaurant equipment). In 1921, Samuel Bickford, a Waldorf vice-president, left to start his own lunchroom business in New York, Bickford's Lunch. Bickford's later merged with Hayes lunch, and Hayes-Bickford restaurants were often near Waldorf restaurants, and competed.

The Waldorf System was publicly traded until it was acquired by Restaurant Associates in the 1960s, and the brand disappeared in the 1970s.

External links
 China patterns used by Waldorf Lunch at the Restaurant Ware Collectors Network: 1234

Notes

Restaurants established in 1903
1903 establishments in Massachusetts
American companies established in 1903
1960s mergers and acquisitions
Food and drink companies disestablished in the 1970s
1970s disestablishments in the United States
Restaurant chains
Springfield, Massachusetts
Defunct companies based in Massachusetts
Defunct restaurant chains in the United States
Companies based in Boston